Boldklubben Avarta is a Danish football club currently playing in the Danish 2nd Division Group 1, which ranks as the third highest league in Denmark. Avarta's home ground is Espelundens Idrætsanlæg in Rødovre, Copenhagen, which has a capacity of 6,000.

History
Boldklubben Avarta was founded on 20 January 1953 as "Rødovrevejens Boldklub". In the first year had the club home at Rødovre Stadium, but since 1960 has been the Espelundens Idrætsanlæg.

The team was relegated from the Danish 2nd Division East following the 2005–06 season, but spent only two seasons in the Denmark Series Pool 1 before gaining promotion back into the Danish 2nd Division East for the 2008–09 season.

Squad
Updated ''14 March 2023"

References

External links
Official site (in Danish)

Football clubs in Denmark
1953 establishments in Denmark
BK Avarta
Football clubs in Copenhagen